Legislative elections were held in South West Africa on 24 April 1974. The last Whites-only election saw a victory for the National Party of South West Africa, which won all 18 seats in the Legislative Assembly.

Results

References

1974 in South West Africa
Elections in Namibia
South West Africa
Election and referendum articles with incomplete results